OAC or OAc may refer to:

Organizations
 Objectivist Academic Center, an educational institution founded by the Ayn Rand Institute
 Ohio Arts Council
 Ohio Athletic Conference, an NCAA Division III athletic conference
 On Athletics Club, a professional group of long distance runners 
 One America Committee
 Online Archive of California
 Ontario Agricultural College
 Ontario Arts Council
 Orthodox Anglican Church, a denomination of the Continuing Anglican movement in America, part of the Orthodox Anglican Communion
 Orthodox Anglican Communion, a worldwide Continuing Anglican body of which the Orthodox Anglican Church is a part

Other
 Acetoxy group (OAc), a chemical functional group
 Object Action Complex
 Oral anti-coagulant
 Ontario Academic Credit
 Amtrak station code for Oakland Coliseum Station
 Olivetolic acid cyclase, an enzyme